Asuras (Sanskrit: असुर) are a class of beings in Indic religions. They are described as power-seeking clans related to the more benevolent Devas (also known as Suras) in Hinduism. In its Buddhist context, the word is sometimes translated "titan", "demigod", or "antigod".

According to Hindu scriptures, the asuras are in constant battle with the devas. Asuras are described in Indian texts as powerful superhuman demigods with good or bad qualities. In early Vedic literature, the good Asuras are called Adityas and are led by Varuna, while the malevolent ones are called Danavas and are led by Vritra.                                     
In the earliest layer of Vedic texts Agni, Indra and other gods are also called Asuras, in the sense of their being "lords" of their respective domains, knowledge and abilities. In later Vedic and post-Vedic texts, the benevolent gods are called Devas, while malevolent Asuras compete against these Devas and are considered "enemy of the gods".

Asuras are part of Hinduism along with Devas, Yakshas (nature spirits), Rakshasas (fierce man-eating beings or demons), Bhutas (ghosts) and many more. Asuras have been featured in many cosmological theories and legends in Hinduism and Buddhism.

Etymology
Monier-Williams traces the etymological roots of Asura (असुर) to Asu (असु), which means life of the spiritual world or departed spirits. In the oldest verses of the Samhita layer of Vedic texts, the Asuras are any spiritual, divine beings including those with good or bad intentions, and constructive or destructive inclinations or nature. In later verses of the Samhita layer of Vedic texts, Monier Williams states the Asuras are "evil spirits, demons and opponents of the gods". The 5th century Buddhist philosopher, Buddhaghosa explains that their name derives from the myth of their defeat at the hands of the god Śakra. According to the story, the asura were dispossessed of their state in Trāyastriṃśa because they became drunk and were thrown down Mount Sumeru. After this incident, they vowed never to drink sura again. In some Buddhist literature, they are sometimes referred to as pūrvadeva (Pāli: pubbadeva), meaning "ancient gods."

Asuras connote the chaos-creating evil, in Indo-Iranian (collectively, Aryan) mythology about the battle between good and evil. Finnish Indologist, Asko Parpola, traces another possible etymological root of Asura to *asera- of Uralic languages, where it means "lord, prince".

In Hindu literature

Rig Veda 
Bhargava states the word, asura, including its variants, asurya and asura, occurs "88 times in the Rig Veda, 71 times in the singular number, 4 times in the dual, 10 times in the plural, and 3 times as the first member of a compound. In this, the feminine form, asuryaa, is included twice. The word, asurya, has been used 19 times as an abstract noun, while the abstract form asuratva occurs 24 times, 22 times in one hymn and twice each in two other hymns".

Bhargava gives a count of the word use for every Vedic deity: Asura is used as an adjective meaning "powerful" or "mighty". In the Rig Veda, two generous kings – as well as some priests – have been described as asuras. One hymn requests a son who is an asura. In nine hymns, Indra is described as asura. He is said to possess asurya 5 times, and once he is said to possess asuratva. Agni has total of 12 asura descriptions, Varuna has 10, Mitra has 8, and Rudra has 6. Book 1 of the Rig Veda describes Savitr (Vedic solar deity) as an asura who is a "kind leader".

Samaveda 
In the Jaiminya (3.35.3), one of three recensions of the SamaVeda, the term 'Asura' is stated to be derived from 'rests' (√ram) in the vital airs (asu), i.e. 'Asu' + 'ram' = 'Asuram' (Asura); this is in reference to the mind being 'asura[-like]'.

Mahabharata 
According to the Bhagavad Gita (16.6-16.7), all beings in the universe have both the divine qualities (daivi sampad) and the demonic qualities (asuri sampad) within each. The sixteenth chapter of the Bhagavad Gita states that pure god-like saints are rare and pure demon-like evil are rare among human beings, and the bulk of humanity is multi-charactered with a few or many faults. According to Jeaneane Fowler, the Gita states that desires, aversions, greed, needs, emotions in various forms "are facets of ordinary lives", and it is only when they turn to lust, hate, cravings, arrogance, conceit, anger, harshness, hypocrisy, cruelty and such negativity- and destruction-inclined that natural human inclinations metamorphose into something demonic (Asura).

Brahmanda Purana 

In the Brahmanda Purana, it is stated the term 'Asura' was used for the Daityas due to their rejection of Varuni (Goddess of Wine) after she emerged from the Ocean of Milk (i.e. 'a-sura', meaning 'those who do not have Sura''', that is, 'wine' or more generally 'liquor'). However, in other legends, the Asuras accept Varuni (see Kurma).
Vishnu Purana
According to the Vishnu Purana, during the Samudra Manthana or the "churning of the ocean", the daityas came to be known as asuras because they rejected Varuni, the goddess of sura "wine", while the devas accepted her and came to be known as suras.

Shiva Purana
Alain Daniélou states that Asuras were initially good, virtuous and powerful in Indian mythology. However, their nature gradually changed and they came to represent evil, vice and abuse of power. In Shiva Purana, they evolved into anti-gods and had to be destroyed because they threatened the gods.Alain Daniélou (1991). The Myths and Gods of India: The Classic Work on Hindu Polytheism from the Princeton Bollingen Series, pp. 141–142. Inner Traditions / Bear & Co. .

The asuras (anti-gods) were depicted to have become proud, vain, to have stopped performing sacrifices, to violate sacred laws, not visit holy places, not cleanse themselves from sin, to be envious of devas, torturous of living beings, creating confusion in everything and challenging the devas.

Alain Daniélou states that the concept of asuras evolved with changing socio-political dynamics in ancient India. Asuras gradually assimilated the demons, spirits, and ghosts worshipped by the enemies of Vedic people, and this created the myths of the malevolent asuras and the rakshasa. The allusions to the disastrous wars between the asuras and the suras, found in the Puranas and the epics, may be the conflict faced by people and migrants into ancient India.

Context
Scholars have disagreed on the nature and evolution of the Asura concept in ancient Indian literature. The most widely studied scholarly views on Asura concept are those of FBJ Kuiper, W Norman Brown, Haug, von Bradke, Otto, Benveniste, Konow, Rajwade, Dandekar, Darmesteter, Bhandarkar and Raja, Banerji-Sastri, Padmanabhayya, Skoeld, SC Roy, kumaraswamy, Shamasastry, Przyluski, Schroeder, Burrows, Hillebrandt, Taraporewala, Lommel, Fausboll, Segerstedt, Thieme, Gerschevitch, Boyce, Macdonnell, Hermann Oldenberg, Geldner, Venkatesvaran, and Jan Gonda.

Kuiper calls Asuras a special group of gods in one of major Vedic theories of creation of the universe. Their role changes only during and after the earth, sky and living beings have been created. The sky world becomes that of Devas, the underworld becomes that of Asuras. The god  Indra is the embodiment of good and represents the Devas, while the dragon Vrtra is the embodiment of evil and an Asura. During this battle between good and evil, creation and destruction, some powerful Asuras side with the good and are called Devas, other powerful Asuras side with the evil and thereafter called Asuras. This is the first major dualism to emerge in the nature of everything in the Universe. Hale (1999), in his review, states that Kuiper theory on Asura is plausible but weak because the Vedas never call Vrtra (the central character) an Asura as the texts describe many other powerful beings. Secondly, Rig Veda never classifies Asura as "group of gods" states Hale, and this is a presumption of Kuiper.

Many scholars describe Asuras to be "lords" with different specialized knowledge, magical powers and special abilities, which only later choose to deploy these for good, constructive reasons or for evil, destructive reasons. The former become known as Asura in the sense of Devas, the later as Asura in the sense of demons. Kuiper, Brown, Otto and others are in this school; however, none of them provide an explanation and how, when and why Asura came ultimately to mean demon. Asuras are non-believers of God and believe in their own powers.

Ananda Coomaraswamy suggested that Devas and Asuras can be best understood as being similar in concept to the Twelve Olympians and the Titans of Greek mythology; both are powerful but have different orientations and inclinations, the Devas representing the powers of Light and the Asuras representing the powers of Darkness in Hindu mythology. According to Coomaraswamy, "the Titan [Asura] is potentially an Angel [Deva], the Angel still by nature a Titan" in Hinduism.Nicholas Gier (1995), Hindu Titanism, Philosophy East and West, Volume 45, Number 1, pages 76, see also 73-96

Indo-Aryan context
In the 19th century, Haug pioneered the idea that the term Asura is linguistically related to the Ahuras of Indo-Aryan people and pre-Zoroastrianism era. In both religions, Ahura of pre-Zoroastrianism (Asura of Indian religions), Vouruna (Varuna) and Daeva (Deva) are found, but their roles are on opposite sides. That is, Ahura evolves to represent the good in pre-Zoroastrianism, while Asura evolves to represent the bad in Vedic religion, while Daeva evolves to represent the bad in pre-Zoroastrianism, while Deva evolves to represent the good in Vedic religion. This contrasting roles have led some scholars to deduce that there may have been wars in proto-Indo-European communities, and their gods and demons evolved to reflect their differences. This idea was thoroughly researched and reviewed by Peter von Bradke in 1885.

The relationship between ahuras / asuras and daevas / devas in Indo-Aryan times, was discussed at length by F.B.J. Kuiper. This theory and other Avesta-related hypotheses developed over the 20th century, are all now questioned particularly for lack of archaeological evidence. Asko Parpola has re-opened this debate by presenting archaeological and linguistic evidence, but notes that the links may go earlier to Uralic languages roots.

Relation to Germanic deities

Some scholars such as Asko Parpola suggest that the word Asura may be related to proto-Uralic and proto-Germanic history. The Aesir-Asura correspondence is the relation between Vedic Sanskrit Asura and Old Norse Æsir and Proto-Uralic *asera, all of which mean 'lord, powerful spirit, god'.Douglas Adams (1997), King, in Encyclopedia of Indo-European Culture, Routledge, page 330 Parpola states that the correspondence extends beyond Asera-Asura, and extends to a host of parallels such as Inmar-Indra, Sampas-Stambha and many other elements of respective mythologies.

Characteristics
In the earliest Vedic literature, all supernatural beings are called Devas and Asuras. A much-studied hymn of the Rig Veda states Devav asura (Asuras who have become Devas), and contrasts it with Asura adevah (Asuras who are not Devas). Each Asura and Deva emerges from the same father (Prajapati), share the same residence (Loka), eat together the same food and drinks (Soma), and have innate potential, knowledge and special powers in Hindu mythology; the only thing that distinguishes "Asura who become Deva" from "Asura who remain Asura" is intent, action and choices they make in their mythic lives.

"Asuras who remain Asura" share the character of powerful beings obsessed with their craving for ill-gotten Soma, and for wealth, ego, anger, unprincipled nature, force, and violence. Further, in Hindu mythology, when they lose, miss, or don't get what they want (because they were distracted by their cravings) the "Asuras who remain Asuras" question, challenge, and attack the "Asuras who became Devas" to loot or extract a portion of what the Devas have and the Asuras do not.

The hostility between the two groups is the source of extensive legends, tales, and literature in Hinduism; however, many texts discuss their hostility in neutral terms – without explicit moral connotations or condemnation. Some of these tales constitute the background of major Hindu Epics and annual festivals, such as the story of Asura Ravana and Deva Rama in the Ramayana, and the legend of Asura Hiranyakashipu and Deva Vishnu as Narasimha, the latter celebrated with the Hindu spring festival of Holika and Holi.

In Buddhist mythology, while all the gods of the Kāmadhātu are subject to passions to some degree, the asuras above all are addicted to them, especially wrath, pride, envy, insincerity, falseness, boasting, and bellicosity. The asuras are said to experience a much more pleasurable life than humans, but they are plagued by envy for the devas, whom they can see just as animals perceive humans.

Symbolism

Edelmann and other scholars state that the dualistic concept of Asura and Deva in Hinduism is a form of symbolism found throughout its ancient and medieval literature.Doris Srinivasan (1997), Many Heads, Arms and Eyes: Origin, Meaning, and Form of Multiplicity in Indian Art, Brill Academic, pages 130-131 In the Upanishads, for example, Devas and Asuras go to Prajāpati to understand what is Self (Atman, soul) and how to realize it. The first answer that Prajāpati gives is simplistic, which the Asuras accept and leave with, but the Devas led by Indra do not accept and question because Indra finds that he hasn't grasped its full significance and the given answer has inconsistencies. Edelmann states that this symbolism embedded in the Upanishads is a reminder that one must struggle with presented ideas, learning is a process, and Deva nature emerges with effort. Similar dichotomies are present in the Puranas literature of Hinduism, where god Indra (a Deva) and the antigod Virocana (an Asura) question a sage for insights into the knowledge of the self. Virocana leaves with the first given answer, believing now he can use the knowledge as a weapon. In contrast, Indra keeps pressing the sage, churning the ideas, and learning about means to inner happiness and power. Edelmann suggests that the Deva-Asura dichotomies in Hindu mythology may be seen as "narrative depictions of tendencies within our selves".

The god (Deva) and antigod (Asura), states Edelmann, are also symbolically the contradictory forces that motivate each individual and people, and thus Deva-Asura dichotomy is a spiritual concept rather than mere genealogical category or species of being. In the Bhāgavata Purana, saints and gods are born in families of Asuras, such as Mahabali and Prahlada, conveying the symbolism that motivations, beliefs and actions rather than one's birth and family circumstances define whether one is Deva-like or Asura-like.

Asuri

Asuri is the feminine of an adjective from asura and in later texts means 'belonging to or having to do with demons and spirits'. Asuri parallels Asura in being "powerful beings", and in early Vedic texts includes all goddesses. The term Asuri also means a Rakshasi in Indian texts.

The powers of an Asuri are projected into plants offering a remedy against leprosy.Garg, Gaṅgā Rām (1992). Encyclopaedia of the Hindu World: Ar-Az, p.751. Volume 3 of Encyclopaedia of the Hindu World. Concept Publishing Company. 

In Book 7, Asuri is a powerful female with the special knowledge of herbs, who uses that knowledge to seduce Deva Indra in Atharva Veda. A hymn invokes this special power in Asuri, and this hymn is stipulated for a woman as a charm to win over the lover she wants.

Similarly, in the Atharva Veda, all sorts of medical remedies and charms are projected as Asuri manifested in plants and animals. Asuri Kalpa is an abhichara (craft) which contains various rites derived from special knowledge and magic of Asuri.Goudriaan, Teun & Gupta, Sanjukta (1981). Hindu Tantric and Śākta Literature, p.114. Otto Harrassowitz Verlag. 

Buddhism

Asuras are a type of supernatural being (anti-gods, demigods or non-god titans) in traditional Buddhist cosmology and a realm of rebirth based on one's karma in current or past lives. They are described in Buddhist texts as creatures who live in lower levels of mount Sumeru, obsessed with sensuous aspects of existence, living with jealousy and endlessly engaged in wars against the creatures who are Devas (gods). As Buddhism spread into East Asia and Southeast Asia, the Asura concept of Indian Buddhism expanded and integrated local pre-existing deities as a part of regional Buddhist pantheon.

 Asura realm 
The asura realm is one of the realms, in which one can be reborn as a result of experiencing the fruits of wholesome karma while engaging in unwholesome karma. Generally, the desire realm recognize as consisting of five realms and the realm of asura tends to be included among the deva realm. But the addition of the asuras in the six-world bhavacakra was created in Tibet at the authority of Je Tsongkhapa.

 Deva-Asura War 
The asuras were dispossessed of their state in Trāyastriṃśa because they became drunk and were thrown down Mount Sumeru by the bodhisatta, as mentioned in Jatakas. This led to ever lasting war between the Devas of Tavatimsa and Asuras, which still continues.
 Asurendra 
In Buddhism, the leaders of the asuras are called asurendra (Pāli: Asurinda, 阿修羅王; lit. "Asura-lord"). There are several of these, as the Asuras are broken into different tribes or factions.  In Pali texts, names that are found include Vepacitti, Rāhu (Verocana), Pahārāda, Sambara, Bali, Sucitti, and Namucī. According to the Lotus Sutra, the four leaders of the asura took refuge in the Buddha after hearing his sermon.

See also

Ahura
Ashur
Aswang
Sooranporu
List of Asuras
Daityas
Danavas
Kalakeyas
Nivātakavacas

References

External links

The Basic Concept of Vedic Religion, FBJ Kuiper, History of Religions, Vol. 15, No. 2 (Nov., 1975), pages 107-120
The Creation Myth of the Rig Veda, W Norman Brown, Journal of the American Oriental Society, Vol. 62, No. 2 (Jun., 1942), pages 85–98
Asura Varuna, RN Dandekar, Annals of the Bhandarkar Oriental Research Institute, Vol. 21, No. 3/4 (1939–40), pages 157-191
The Vedic Gods of Japan, S Kak (2004), (a discussion of Asuras'' in Japanese mythology)

 
Rigvedic deities
Non-human races in Hindu mythology
Types of deities